The 2012–13 Houston Rockets season was the 46th season of the franchise in the National Basketball Association (NBA), and the 42nd based in Houston.

The season is best remembered for acquiring All-Star and Sixth Man of the Year James Harden from the Oklahoma City Thunder in a trade. Along with Harden, the team brought in point guard Jeremy Lin after a magical season with the New York Knicks last year and center Omer Asik.

Despite a stellar season from new team captains Harden and Lin, the Rockets only managed to play mediocre basketball all season finishing with a 45–37 record, clinching the number 8 seed in the West. The Rockets season ended with a first round loss to Harden's former team, the Oklahoma City Thunder, in six games. As Houston hosted the 2013 NBA All-Star Game, Harden was the only representative.

Key dates
June 26: The Rockets trade forward Chase Budinger and their rights to Lior Eliyahu to the Minnesota Timberwolves for their 18th draft pick.
June 27: Houston trades center Samuel Dalembert and their 14th draft pick to the Milwaukee Bucks for shooting guard Shaun Livingston, small forward Jon Brockman, power forward Jon Leuer, and their 12th draft pick.
June 28: The 2012 NBA draft takes place at Prudential Center in Newark, New Jersey.
July 1: Free agency has begun.
July 11: Teams can now sign, trade, and even amnesty players to their liking.
July 13: Houston uses their amnesty clause on Luis Scola. His rights were received by the Phoenix Suns two days later.
July 18: Houston officially signs point guard Jeremy Lin, after the New York Knicks decline on matching their offer.
July 25: Houston officially signs center Ömer Aşık, after the Chicago Bulls decline on matching their offer.
March 5: Houston sign 09-10 NBA Most Improved Player Award and former Sacramento Kings point guard Aaron Brooks. In addition, Houston waive F Tyler Honeycutt in order to make room for Aaron Brooks.

Draft picks

Roster

Regular season

Game log

|- style="background:#cfc;"
| 1 || October 31 || @ Detroit
| 
| James Harden (37)
| Ömer Aşık (9)
| James Harden (12)
| The Palace of Auburn Hills16,646
| 1–0
|- style="background:;"

|- style="background:#cfc;"
| 2 || November 2 || @ Atlanta
| 
| James Harden (45)
| Ömer Aşık (19)
| Jeremy Lin (7)
| Philips Arena18,238
| 2–0	
|- style="background:#fcc;"								
| 3 || November 3 || Portland
| 
| James Harden (24)
| Ömer Aşık (15)
| Jeremy Lin (7)
| Toyota Center18,140
| 2–1
|- style="background:#fcc;"								
| 4 || November 7 || Denver
| 
| Carlos Delfino (19)
| Ömer Aşık (13)
| Jeremy Lin (6)
| Toyota Center13,372
| 2–2	
|- style="background:#fcc;"								
| 5 || November 9 || @ Memphis
| 
| Chandler Parsons (19)
| Ömer Aşık (13)
| Patterson & Harden (4)
| FedExForum16,087
| 2–3	
|- style="background:#cfc;"								
| 6 || November 10 || Detroit
| 
| James Harden (20)
| Aşık & Morris (8)
| Jeremy Lin (8)
| Toyota Center15,037
| 3–3	
|- style="background:#fcc;"								
| 7 || November 12 || Miami
| 
| Chandler Parsons (25)
| Ömer Aşık (14)
| Jeremy Lin (6)
| Toyota Center18,041
| 3–4	
|- style="background:#cfc;"								
| 8 || November 14 || New Orleans
| 
| James Harden (30)
| Ömer Aşık (12)
| Lin, Harden & Delfino (4)
| Toyota Center14,535
| 4–4	
|- style="background:#fcc;"								
| 9 || November 16 || @ Portland
| 
| James Harden (29)
| Ömer Aşık (16)
| Jeremy Lin (11)
| Rose Garden20,382
| 4–5	
|- style="background:#fcc;"								
| 10 || November 18 || @ L. A. Lakers
| 
| Chandler Parsons (24)
| Ömer Aşık (9)
| Jeremy Lin (10)
| Staples Center18,997
| 4–6	
|- style="background:#fcc;"							
| 11 || November 19 || @ Utah
| 
| Patrick Patterson (19)
| Chandler Parsons (10)
| Chandler Parsons (5)
| EnergySolutions Arena19,197
| 4–7	
|- style="background:#cfc;"								
| 12 || November 21 || Chicago
| 
| James Harden (28)
| Chandler Parsons (13)
| Lin & Harden (3)
| Toyota Center15,950
| 5–7	
|- style="background:#cfc;"								
| 13 || November 23 || New York
| 
| James Harden (33)
| Ömer Aşık (14)
| James Harden (9)
| Toyota Center18,038
| 6–7	
|- style="background:#cfc;"							
| 14 || November 27 || Toronto
| 
| James Harden (24)
| Ömer Aşık (18)
| James Harden (12)
| Toyota Center12,907
| 7–7
|- style="background:#fcc;"								
| 15 || November 28 || @ Oklahoma City
| 
| Patrick Patterson (27)
| Ömer Aşık (12)
| Jeremy Lin (8)
| Chesapeake Energy Arena18,203
| 7–8

|- style="background:#cfc;"								
| 16 || December 1 || Utah
| 
| Patrick Patterson (20)
| Ömer Aşık (12)
| Jeremy Lin (8)
| Toyota Center14,432
| 8–8	
|- style="background:#cfc;"
| 17 || December 4 || L. A. Lakers
| 
| Toney Douglas (22)
| James Harden (10)
| James Harden (6)
| Toyota Center18,052
| 9–8
|- style="background:#fcc;"								
| 18 || December 7 || @ San Antonio
| 
| James Harden (29)
| Jeremy Lin (6)
| Patterson & Harden (5)
| AT&T Center18,581
| 9–9	
|- style="background:#fcc;"								
| 19 || December 8 || Dallas
| 
| James Harden (39)
| Chandler Parsons (10)
| James Harden (9)
| Toyota Center15,726
| 9–10	
|- style="background:#fcc;"
| 20 || December 10 || San Antonio
| 
| Jeremy Lin (38)
| Ömer Aşık (10)
| Jeremy Lin (7)
| Toyota Center13,959
| 9–11
|- style="background:#cfc;"
| 21 || December 12 || Washington
| 
| James Harden (31)
| Ömer Aşık (16)
| Jeremy Lin (6)
| Toyota Center13,351
| 10–11
|- style="background:#cfc;"								
| 22 || December 14 || Boston
| 
| James Harden (21)
| Ömer Aşık (10)
| Chandler Parsons (8)
| Toyota Center15,679
| 11–11
|- style="background:#fcc;"
| 23 || December 16 || @ Toronto
| 
| James Harden (28)
| Ömer Aşık (13)
| Harden & Parsons (4)
| Air Canada Centre17,863
| 11–12
|- style="background:#cfc;"								
| 24 || December 17 || @ New York
| 
| James Harden (28)
| James Harden (10)
| Jeremy Lin (8)
| Madison Square Garden19,033
| 12–12	
|- style="background:#cfc;"								
| 25 || December 19 || Philadelphia
| 
| James Harden (33)
| Ömer Aşık (15)
| James Harden (7)
| Toyota Center15,266
| 13–12	
|- style="background:#cfc;"								
| 26 || December 22 || Memphis
| 
| James Harden (31)
| Ömer Aşık (12)
| Jeremy Lin (11)
| Toyota Center18,029
| 14–12	
|- style="background:#cfc;"								
| 27 || December 25 || @ Chicago
| 
| James Harden (26)
| Ömer Aşık (18)
| Jeremy Lin (11)
| United Center22,310
| 15–12	
|- style="background:#cfc;"								
| 28 || December 26 || @ Minnesota
| 
| James Harden (30)
| Ömer Aşık (17)
| Chandler Parsons (5)
| Target Center20,340
| 16–12	
|- style="background:#fcc;"								
| 29 || December 28 || @ San Antonio
| 
| James Harden (33)
| Ömer Aşık (10)
| Jeremy Lin (8)
| AT&T Center18,581
| 16–13	
|- style="background:#fcc;"								
| 30 || December 29 || Oklahoma City
| 
| James Harden (25)
| Aşık & Smith (8)
| Jeremy Lin (7)
| Toyota Center18,460
| 16–14	
|- style="background:#cfc;"								
| 31 || December 31 || Atlanta
| 
| James Harden (28)
| Ömer Aşık (17)
| Jeremy Lin (8)
| Toyota Center18,160
| 17–14	

|- style="background:#cfc;"								
| 32 || January 2 || New Orleans
| 
| James Harden (31)
| Patterson & Parsons (10)
| Lin & Harden (7)
| Toyota Center18,198
| 18–14	
|- style="background:#cfc;"								
| 33 || January 4 || @ Milwaukee
| 
| James Harden (29)
| Ömer Aşık (8)
| Lin, Harden & Parsons (7)
| BMO Harris Bradley Center15,867
| 19–14	
|- style="background:#cfc;"								
| 34 || January 5 || @ Cleveland
| 
| James Harden (29)
| Greg Smith (11)
| Jeremy Lin (5)
| Quicken Loans Arena16,866
| 20–14	
|- style="background:#cfc;"								
| 35 || January 8 || L. A. Lakers
| 
| James Harden (31)
| Lin, Harden & Delfino (6)
| James Harden (9)
| Toyota Center18,135
| 21–14	
|- style="background:#fcc;"								
| 36 || January 9 || @ New Orleans
| 
| James Harden (25)
| Patrick Patterson (10)
| Jeremy Lin (5)
| New Orleans Arena11,453
| 21–15	
|- style="background:#fcc;"								
| 37 || January 11 || @ Boston
| 
| James Harden (24)
| Ömer Aşık (11)
| Jeremy Lin (6)
| TD Garden18,624
| 21–16 	
|- style="background:#fcc;"								
| 38 || January 12 || @ Philadelphia
| 
| James Harden (29)
| Ömer Aşık (10)
| James Harden (6)
| Wells Fargo Center17,329
| 21–17	
|- style="background:#fcc;"								
| 39 || January 15 || L. A. Clippers
| 
| James Harden (23)
| Ömer Aşık (9)
| Jeremy Lin (10)
| Toyota Center16,823
| 21–18	
|- style="background:#fcc;"								
| 40 || January 16 || @ Dallas
| 
| James Harden (20)
| Ömer Aşık (15)
| Jeremy Lin (7)
| American Airlines Center20,147
| 21–19	
|- style="background:#fcc;"
| 41 || January 18 || @ Indiana
| 
| Ömer Aşık (22)
| Ömer Aşık (12)
| James Harden (7)
| Bankers Life Fieldhouse16,902
| 21–20
|- style="background:#fcc;"
| 42 || January 19 || @ Minnesota
| 
| James Harden (18)
| Greg Smith (8)
| James Harden (5)
| Target Center16,799
| 21–21
|- style="background:#cfc;"
| 43 || January 21 || @ Charlotte
| 
| James Harden (29)
| Aşık & Morris (8)
| James Harden (7)
| Time Warner Cable Arena16,108
| 22–21
|- style="background:#fcc;"								
| 44 || January 23 || Denver
| 
| James Harden (23)
| Ömer Aşık (13)
| James Harden (7)
| Toyota Center16,867
| 22–22	
|- style="background:#cfc;"								
| 45 || January 25 || @ New Orleans
| 
| James Harden (30)
| Patrick Patterson (13)
| Lin & Harden (8)
| New Orleans Arena15,302
| 23–22	
|- style="background:#cfc;"
| 46 || January 26 || Brooklyn
| 
| James Harden (29)
| Ömer Aşık (16)
| Chandler Parsons (11)
| Toyota Center18,236
| 24–22
|- style="background:#cfc;"
| 47 || January 28 || @ Utah
| 
| James Harden (25)
| Ömer Aşık (19)
| Jeremy Lin (7)
| EnergySolutions Arena18,387
| 25–22	
|- style="background:#fcc;"
| 48 || January 30 || @ Denver
| 
| Jeremy Lin (22)
| Ömer Aşık (18)
| Jeremy Lin (5)
| Pepsi Center17,399
| 25–23

|- style="background:#cfc;"									
| 49 || February 2 || Charlotte
| 
| Patterson & Parsons (24)
| Ömer Aşık (15)
| James Harden (11)
| Toyota Center15,494
| 26–23	
|- style="background:#cfc;"								
| 50 || February 5 || Golden State
| 
| Jeremy Lin (28)
| Ömer Aşık (15)
| Jeremy Lin (9)
| Toyota Center15,453
| 27–23	
|- style="background:#fcc;"								
| 51 || February 6 || @ Miami
| 
| James Harden (36)
| Ömer Aşık (14)
| James Harden (7)
| American Airlines Arena19,693
| 27–24	
|- style="background:#cfc;"
| 52 || February 8 || Portland
| 
| James Harden (35)
| Ömer Aşık (13)
| James Harden (11)
| Toyota Center15,655
| 28–24
|- style="background:#fcc;"
| 53 || February 10 || @ Sacramento
| 
| James Harden (30)
| Ömer Aşık (12)
| Patrick Beverley (8)
| Power Balance Pavilion15,526
| 28–25
|- style="background:#cfc;"
| 54 || February 12 || @ Golden State
| 
| James Harden (27)
| Ömer Aşık (15)
| Jeremy Lin (10)
| Oracle Arena19,596
| 29–25	
|- style="background:#fcc;"
| 55 || February 13 || @ L. A. Clippers
| 
| Chandler Parsons (17)
| Ömer Aşık (7)
| Jeremy Lin (7)
| Staples Center19,251
| 29–26
|- align="center"
|colspan="9" bgcolor="#bbcaff"|All-Star Break
|- style="background:#cfc;"
| 56 || February 20 || Oklahoma City
|  
| James Harden (46)
| Ömer Aşık (10)
| Jeremy Lin (8)
| Toyota Center18,224
| 30–26	
|- style="background:#cfc;"							
| 57 || February 22 || @ Brooklyn
|  
| Carlos Delfino (22)
| Ömer Aşık (11)
| Jeremy Lin (6)
| Barclays Center17,732 
| 31–26
|- style="background:#fcc;"							
| 58 || February 23 || @ Washington
| 
| James Harden (27)
| Ömer Aşık (10) 
| James Harden (6)
| Verizon Center20,308 
| 31–27
|- style="background:#fcc;"							
| 59 || February 27 || Milwaukee
|  
| James Harden (25)
| Ömer Aşık (22) 
| James Harden (7)
| Toyota Center15,463 
| 31–28

|- style="background:#cfc;"									
| 60 || March 1 || @ Orlando
|  
| James Harden (24)
| Ömer Aşık (12) 
| James Harden (8)
| Amway Center16,677 
| 32–28
|- style="background:#cfc;"								
| 61 || March 3 || Dallas
| 
| Chandler Parsons (32)
| Ömer Aşık (10)
| Jeremy Lin (9)
| Toyota Center18,123 
| 33–28	
|- style="background:#fcc;"								
| 62 || March 6 || @ Dallas
| 
| James Harden (28)
| Ömer Aşık (15)
| James Harden (9)
| American Airlines Center20,344
| 33–29
|- style="background:#cfc;"								
| 63 || March 8 || @ Golden State
| 
| Chandler Parsons (26)
| Ömer Aşık (17)
| James Harden (11)
| Oracle Arena19,596 
| 34–29
|- style="background:#fcc;"							
| 64 || March 9 || @ Phoenix
|  
| James Harden (38)
| Ömer Aşık (16)
| James Harden (8)
| US Airways Center16,734 
| 34–30
|- style="background:#cfc;"							
| 65 || March 13 || Phoenix
|  
| Donatas Motiejūnas (19)
| Greg Smith (12)
| Jeremy Lin (6)
| Toyota Center18,132 
| 35–30
|- style="background:#cfc;"							
| 66 || March 15 || Minnesota
| 
| James Harden (37)
| Ömer Aşık (11)
| James Harden (8)
| Toyota Center18,046
| 36–30
|- style="background:#fcc;"							
| 67 || March 17 || Golden State
|  
| James Harden (21)
| Ömer Aşık (11)
| James Harden (8)
| Toyota Center18,219 
| 36–31
|- style="background:#cfc;"							
| 68 || March 20 || Utah
|  
| James Harden (29)
| Ömer Aşık (12)
| Jeremy Lin (6)
| Toyota Center15,739 
| 37–31
|- style="background:#cfc;"							
| 69 || March 22 || Cleveland
|   
| James Harden (20)
| Greg Smith (13)
| Jeremy Lin (6)
| Toyota Center15,694 
| 38–31
|- style="background:#cfc;"							
| 70 || March 24 || San Antonio
|  
| James Harden (29)
| Ömer Aşık (14)
| James Harden (6)
| Toyota Center18,245 
| 39–31
|- style="background:#fcc;"							
| 71 || March 27 || Indiana
|  
| James Harden (22)
| Greg Smith (19)
| James Harden (8)
| Toyota Center18,134 
| 39–32
|- style="background:#fcc;"								
| 72 || March 29 || @ Memphis
|  
| Chandler Parsons (16)
| Greg Smith (9)
| James Harden & James Anderson (4)
| FedExForum18,119 
| 39–33
|- style="background:#cfc;"							
| 73 || March 30 || L. A. Clippers
|  
| Chandler Parsons  Jeremy Lin &  Francisco García (15)
| Ömer Aşık (12)
| Chandler Parsons (4)
| Toyota Center18,303 
| 40–33

|- style="background:#cfc;"								
| 74 || April 1 || Orlando
|  
| Ömer Aşık (28)
| Ömer Aşık (18)
| Jeremy Lin (11)
| Toyota Center16,273 
| 41–33
|- style="background:#cfc;"								
| 75 || April 3 || @ Sacramento
| 
| Chandler Parsons (29)
| Terrence Jones (12)
| Jeremy Lin (10)
| Sleep Train Arena12,377 
| 42–33
|- style="background:#cfc;"									
| 76 || April 5 || @ Portland
| 
| James Harden (33)
| Ömer Aşık (11)
| Jeremy Lin (8)
| Rose Garden20,400
| 43–33	
|- style="background:#fcc;"									
| 77 || April 6 || @ Denver
| 
| Jeremy Lin (23)
| Ömer Aşık (9)
| Patrick Beverley (9)
| Pepsi Center19,155
| 43–34
|- style="background:#cfc;"									
| 78 || April 9 || Phoenix
| 
| James Harden (33)
| Ömer Aşık (22)
| Harden & Lin (6)
| Toyota Center16,673
| 44–34
|- style="background:#fcc;"								
| 79 || April 12 || Memphis
| 
| James Harden (30)
| Terrence Jones (12)
| James Harden (6)
| Toyota Center18,163
| 44–35
|- style="background:#cfc;"								
| 80 || April 14 || Sacramento
| 
| James Harden (29)
| Ömer Aşık (12)
| James Harden (9)
| Toyota Center18,138
| 45–35	
|- style="background:#fcc;"								
| 81 || April 15 || @ Phoenix
| 
| Chandler Parsons (24)
| Ömer Aşık (7)
| Chandler Parsons (7)
| US Airways Center17,135
| 45–36
|- style="background:#fcc;"							
| 82 || April 17 || @ L. A. Lakers
| 
| James Harden (30)
| Ömer Aşık (12)
| Jeremy Lin (8)
| Staples Center18,997
| 45–37

Standings

Playoffs

|- align="center" bgcolor="#ffcccc"
| 1
| April 21
| @ Oklahoma City
| L 91–120
| James Harden (20)
| Terrence Jones (8)
| Lin, Beverley (4)
| Chesapeake Energy Arena18,203
| 0–1
|- align="center" bgcolor="#ffcccc"
| 2
| April 24
| @ Oklahoma City
| L 102–105
| James Harden (36)
| Ömer Aşık (14)
| Harden, Beverley (6)
| Chesapeake Energy Arena18,203
| 0–2
|- align="center" bgcolor="#ffcccc"
| 3
| April 27
| Oklahoma City
| L 101–104
| James Harden (30)
| Aşık, Harden (8)
| Chandler Parsons (7)
| Toyota Center18,163
| 0–3
|- align="center" bgcolor="#ccffcc"
| 4
| April 29
| Oklahoma City
| W 105–103
| Chandler Parsons (27)
| Ömer Aşık (14)
| Chandler Parsons (8)
| Toyota Center18,081
| 1–3
|- align="center" bgcolor="#ccffcc"
| 5
| May 1
| @ Oklahoma City
| W 107–100
| James Harden (31)
| Ömer Aşık (11)
| Chandler Parsons (4)
| Chesapeake Energy Arena18,203
| 2–3
|- align="center" bgcolor="#ffcccc"
| 6
| May 3
| Oklahoma City
| L 94–103
| James Harden (26)
| Ömer Aşık (13)
| James Harden (7)
| Toyota Center18,357
| 2–4
|-

References

Houston Rockets seasons
Houston Rockets